Kedzie is a station on the Chicago Transit Authority's 'L' system, serving the Green Line and the East Garfield Park neighborhood. It opened in March 1894, and is three blocks south of Metra's Kedzie station on the Union Pacific/West Line. It is also near the Chicago Center for Green Technology.

Station Layout
The station consists of two side platforms. There is only one entrance to the station, adjacent to the eastbound platform. Access to the westbound platform is provided by a bridge over the platforms. However, each platform does have its own exit-only staircase.

History
The station was opened in March 1894, and is typical of the stations built in 1892-93 by the Lake Street Elevated Railroad, consisting of two rooms of windows on each side of the station. During the first fifty years of its existence, very little changed retaining its original Queen Anne style. Given the weakening of the number of passengers, the presence of an employee's desk was more assured as the hours from January 1, 1958. On January 5, 1964, outputs auxiliary were opened to prevent the crossing of the flow of passengers.

In 1974, the Chicago Transit Authority demolished the 2 rooms of the counters in order to replace them with a single utility room on the side Inbound to reduce the operating cost of Kedzie. This meant for passengers to Harlem going pay their ticket on the other platform before they can take their train. On January 9, 1994, the green line, was closed for a two-year rehabilitation. Like other stations of the line, Kedzie, was replaced by new modern equipment built on the model devised by architects Skidmore, Owings & Merrill. The green line and Kedzie reopened May 12, 1996, in a temporary form until the station is fully completed and inaugurated on December 16, 1996.

Unlike previous incarnations of the station, a single pricing control area was built for both directions, it is always located at the level of the paths to the centre (Inbound) but an elevator allows traffic between channels. In December 2002, Kedzie was one of the four new project of Chicago Transit Authority monitoring pilot (with Roosevelt and 95/Dan Ryan on the Red Line and 35/Archer on the Orange Line). Kedzie is accessible to people with reduced mobility and 429.710 passengers have used it in 2008.-->

Bus and rail connections
CTA
  52 Kedzie 

Metra
Kedzie (Metra station)

Notes and references

Notes

References

External links
Kedzie (Lake Street Line) Station Page
Kedzie Avenue entrance from Google Maps Street View

CTA Green Line stations
Railway stations in the United States opened in 1894